Broadway Hotel may refer to:

 in Australia
 Broadway Hotel, Woolloongabba in Brisbane, Queensland

in the United States

Valentine on Broadway Hotel, in Kansas City, Missouri, listed on the National Register of Historic Places in Missouri
Broadway Hotel (Custer, Oklahoma)
Broadway Hotel (Portland, Oregon)
Broadway Hotel (Salt Lake City, Utah), listed on the National Register of Historic Places in Utah

 in music

"Broadway Hotel", a song by Al Stewart from his 1976 album Year of the Cat